Bayali may refer to:

Bayali Atashov, Azerbaijani economist
Bayali language, an Aboriginal Australian language of the Rockhampton area of Queensland
 Yetimarla language, an Aboriginal language of the Mackenzie/Fitzroy Rivers area in Queensland, also known as Bayali